Anton Tikhomirov (born 23 August 1990) is a Russian professional ice hockey player.

Tikhomirov played with HC Vityaz Podolsk of the Kontinental Hockey League (KHL) during the 2012–13 season.

References

External links

Living people
HC Vityaz players
Russian ice hockey forwards
1990 births
Ice hockey people from Saint Petersburg